Colonel Prithipal Singh Gill (11 December 1920 – 5 December 2021) was an Indian centenarian and the only officer of the Indian Armed Forces known to have served in all three of its branches.

Career
Born in Patiala State on December 11, 1920, Gill studied at Government College Lahore. A passionate flyer, he earned a flying licence at Walton Airport in Lahore, and in 1942, without informing his family, joined the Indian Air Force. Commissioned a pilot officer, Gill was training on Harvard aircraft at Karachi when his father Harpal Singh Gill, an army officer, arranged for his transfer from the IAF as the family considered flying unsafe.

Gill transferred to the Royal Indian Navy, and was commissioned a temporary sub-lieutenant in the gunnery branch of the Royal Indian Naval Volunteer Reserve (RINVR) on 25 January 1943. For the remainder of the Second World War, Gill served on minesweepers and escort vessels, serving on convoy duties protecting shipping in the Persian Gulf. He was subsequently sent to attend the Long Gunnery Staff Course at the Army School of Artillery in Deolali, qualifying as an instructor. He ended his naval service in September 1948, and briefly served as a civil servant.

In April 1951, Gill joined the Indian Army. Though he had initially hoped for assignment to his father's former battalion, the 1st Sikh Regiment, he was instead posted to the Regiment of Artillery due to his prior experience with gunnery. His initial posting was with the Gwalior Mountain Battery, equipped with 5.4 inch guns. Gill later served with 34th Field Regiment and was promoted to major on 13 May 1956.

Promoted to lieutenant-colonel on 2 August 1962, Gill raised and commanded 71 Medium Regiment during the Indo-Pakistan War of 1965. Seeing action in the Sialkot sector, during a battle he personally led a mission to retrieve four of his guns which had been cut off by the enemy. He was promoted to colonel on 19 June 1968 (seniority from 24 May), and was appointed a sector commander in the Assam Rifles, stationed at Ukhrul in Manipur. He took early retirement from the army, relinquishing his commission on 1 December 1970.

Personal life
Gill married his wife Preminder Kaur (born 1927) on 24 December 1950. He died on 5 December 2021, less than a week before his 101st birthday in his home in Chandigarh.

References

1920 births
2021 deaths
Men centenarians
Indian centenarians
Indian military personnel of World War II
Indian Air Force officers
Royal Indian Navy officers
Indian Army officers
Indian aviators
Government College University, Lahore alumni